Guntars Mankus (born 5 July 1969) is a Latvian orienteer, rogainer and adventure racer.

At the 5th World Rogaining Championships in Lesná, Czech Republic in 2002 he won a gold medal and the title of the World Rogaining Champion in Mixed Open category in team with Anita Liepina and Raimonds Lapiņš. At 6th World Rogaining Championships in Arizona, United States in 2004 the same team won a bronze medal in Mixed Open category. At 7th World Rogaining Championships in Warrumbungles, Australia they regained the title of the World Rogaining Champion in Mixed Open category. At 13th World Rogaining Championships in Kiilopää, Finland he won a silver medal in Mixed Open category in team with Irita Puķīte.

In 2005 he won a gold medal at the European Rogaining Championships in Mixed Open category in team with Anita Liepina in Nõva, Estonia. In 2016 he won a gold medal at the European Rogaining Championships in Mixed Open category in team with Irita Puķīte in Aralar Range, Spain.

In 2014 he won a gold medal and the title of the World Champion in precision orienteering (PreO Open) and a bronze medal as a member of the Latvian team at the World Trail Orienteering Championships in Lavarone, Italy.

References

1969 births
Living people
Latvian orienteers
Male orienteers
Trail orienteers